A Day for a Miracle is a 2011 film directed by Andreas Prochaska in 2011 and produced by Rowboat Film- und Fernsehproduktion and Graf Film for public German TV channel ZDF and Austrian ORF. The film is based on real events, telling the story of a three-year-old girl from Austria, who fell into the lake behind her parents' house in 1998, and had been under water for 30 minutes when she was found. Nobody believed she had a chance at survival when the young cardiovascular surgeon Dr. Markus Thalmann takes up the seemingly hopeless fight for the young girl's life. His rescue has written medical history. The screenplay was written by Christoph Silber and Thorsten Wettcke.

The film premiered at the 2011 Filmfest Hamburg, and later showed in television in Germany and Austria.

Plot 
Dr. Markus Höchstmann, a young and ambitious cardiovascular surgeon and ultra marathon runner from Vienna, has landed his first job in a clinic in Klagenfurt, province of Carinthia. As his wife and son are still living in Vienna, he needs to commute to the capital every chance he gets to see them. His colleagues have little sympathy for him when he is asked to fill in for the chief of surgery on the weekend of his son's birthday to perform a standard procedure on an important local politician.
This is when an emergency is flown in: a four-year-old girl has drowned, her body is lifeless and cold, her heart is not beating. After 30 minutes under water, the damage to her brain is considered too extensive to try to resuscitate her. Höchstmann disagrees. Against the opinions of his more experienced colleagues and against all odds, he decides to fight for the little girl's life and performs a medical miracle.

Awards

Wins 
 International Emmy Award 2013, in the category: TV Movie/Mini-Series.
 The film won two Austrian TV awards Romy in 2012, for "Best TV screenplay" (by Christoph Silber and Thorsten Wettcke) and "Best TV Producer" (Sam Davis, Rowboat and co-producer Klaus Graf of Graf Film, Austria)
 Director Andreas Prochaska won the Bavarian TV Award for "Best Directing TV Movie" in 2012.
 Gerti Drassl won the German Actors Award 2013 (Deutscher Schauspielerpreis) in the category "Best Actress in a Supporting Role"
 Günter-Rohrbach-Filmpreis 2012 for supporting actors Gerti Drassl and Gerhard Liebmann

Nominations 
 Nominated for Prix Europa 2012
 Nominated for Grimme-Preis 2013, category "Fiction"
 Nomination in the category "Best Director TV", "Regiepreis Metropolis" for Andreas Prochaska

References

External links

 Website of Rowboat Film-und Fernsehproduktion

2011 films
German drama films
Austrian drama films
International Emmy Award for Best TV Movie or Miniseries
2010s German films